Meningeal branch (branch of the meninges) can refer to:
 Meningeal branches of vertebral artery
 Meningeal branch of occipital artery
 Meningeal branches of the ascending pharyngeal artery
 Meningeal branch of vagus nerve
 Meningeal branch of the mandibular nerve
 Meningeal branches of spinal nerve